Dayana Joselyn Cazares Vera (born December 30, 1999) is a Mexican professional football midfielder who currently plays for América of the Liga MX Femenil.

Honors and awards

Club
Individual
 Liga MX Femenil Team of The Season: Apertura 2017

International
Mexico U20
 CONCACAF Women's U-20 Championship: 2018

References

External links
 
 Dayana Cazares at Club América Femenil 
 

1999 births
Living people
Mexican women's footballers
Footballers from Mexico City
Liga MX Femenil players
Club América (women) footballers
Women's association football midfielders
Mexican footballers